Maiestas jogensis is a species of bug from the Cicadellidae family that is endemic to India. It was originally named Recilia jogensis by Dash and Viraktamath in 1998, but was moved to Maiestas following a 2009 revision.

References

Insects described in 1998
Endemic fauna of India
Insects of India
Maiestas